With No Human Intervention is the third album by industrial black metal band Aborym.  The album's title was coined by former Emperor drummer Bard Eithun, as well as the lyrics for the title track and "Faustian Spirit of the Earth". Carpathian Forest vocalist Nattefrost provides backing vocals on various tracks, as well as lead vocals on "The Alienation of a Blackened Heart".

This is the last Aborym album to feature Attila Csihar as the primary lead vocalist (he returned once more as lead vocalist on the track "Man Bites God" on Generator), as he left the band to re-join Mayhem. Guitarist Set Teitan departed after this album in order to join Dissection.

Track listing

Personnel
Set Teitan– guitars, sampling, electronic drums
Malfeitor Fabban – bass, synthesizer, keyboards, programming
Attila Csihar – vocals, backing vocals
Nysrok Infernalien – guitars, guitar solos, synthesizer, keyboards, programming

References

2003 albums
Aborym albums
SPV/Steamhammer albums